Fasal Hassan Shahid (born 4 March 1986) is an English cricketer. Shahid is a right-handed batsman who bowls right-arm medium pace. He was born in Birmingham, Warwickshire.

Shahid made his only List A appearance for the Marylebone Cricket Club against Bangladesh A. In this match he took a single wicket, that of Shakib Al Hasan, for the cost of 33 runs from 7 overs. With the bat he scored 2 runs before being dismissed LBW by Rubel Hossain. He made his debut for Herefordshire in the 2009 MCCA Knockout Trophy against Wiltshire. Shahid currently plays Minor counties cricket for Herefordshire.

He has previously played Second XI cricket for the Worcestershire Second XI.

References

External links
Fasal Shahid at ESPNcricinfo

1986 births
Living people
Cricketers from Birmingham, West Midlands
English cricketers
Marylebone Cricket Club cricketers
Herefordshire cricketers
English cricketers of the 21st century
British Asian cricketers